Línhú (临湖) may refer to the following locations in China:

 Linhu Subdistrict, Sujiatun District, Shenyang, Liaoning
Towns
 Linhu, Woyang County, Anhui
 Linhu, Suzhou, in Wuzhong District, Suzhou, Jiangsu
 Linhu, Yushan County, in Yushan County, Jiangxi
People
 Linhu (people) (林胡), a Xirong/Xiongnu tribe in Inner Mongolia at early Zhou Dynasty  BC

See also
 Lin Hu (disambiguation)
 Linghu